Foxhome is a city in Wilkin County, Minnesota, United States. The population was 126 at the 2020 census. It is part of the Wahpeton, ND—MN Micropolitan Statistical Area.

History
A post office called Foxhome has been in operation since 1896. The city was named for Robert A. Fox, a local real estate agent.

Geography

Foxhome is located between Fergus Falls and Breckenridge on Minnesota State Highway 210.

Demographics

2010 census
As of the census of 2010, there were 116 people, 52 households, and 32 families residing in the city. The racial makeup of the city was 97.4% White, 0.9% Native American, and 1.7% from two or more races.

There were 52 households, of which 23.1% had children under the age of 18 living with them, 48.1% were married couples living together, 9.6% had a female householder with no husband present, 3.8% had a male householder with no wife present, and 38.5% were non-families. 32.7% of all households were made up of individuals, and 5.7% had someone living alone who was 65 years of age or older. The average household size was 2.23 and the average family size was 2.84.

The median age in the city was 47.3 years. 20.7% of residents were under the age of 18; 6.9% were between the ages of 18 and 24; 17.1% were from 25 to 44; 38.8% were from 45 to 64; and 16.4% were 65 years of age or older. The gender makeup of the city was 55.2% male and 44.8% female.

2000 census
As of the census of 2000, there were 143 people, 58 households, and 41 families residing in the city. The racial makeup of the city was 100.00% White. Hispanic or Latino of any race were 0.70% of the population.

There were 58 households, out of which 32.8% had children under the age of 18 living with them, 55.2% were married couples living together, 6.9% had a female householder with no husband present, and 29.3% were non-families. 25.9% of all households were made up of individuals, and 8.6% had someone living alone who was 65 years of age or older. The average household size was 2.47 and the average family size was 3.00.

In the city, the population was spread out, with 24.5% under the age of 18, 6.3% from 18 to 24, 29.4% from 25 to 44, 25.2% from 45 to 64, and 14.7% who were 65 years of age or older. The median age was 41 years. For every 100 females, there were 107.2 males. For every 100 females age 18 and over, there were 116.0 males.

The median income for a household in the city was $29,688, and the median income for a family was $41,250. Males had a median income of $25,000 versus $22,500 for females. The per capita income for the city was $13,654. There were 5.6% of families and 13.2% of the population living below the poverty line, including 25.7% of under eighteens and none of those over 64.

References

Cities in Minnesota
Cities in Wilkin County, Minnesota
Wahpeton micropolitan area